Rydzewski (feminine: Rydzewska) is a Polish surname. Notable people with the surname include:

 Frank Rydzewski (1892–1979), American football player
 Władysław Rydzewski (1911–1980), Polish ornithologist

Polish-language surnames